Ethan Embry (born June 13, 1978) is an American film and television actor. He is known for his role as Mark in Empire Records, Preston in Can't Hardly Wait, The Bass Player in That Thing You Do!, and as Bobby Ray in Sweet Home Alabama.

Career
Embry (originally credited as Ethan Randall) started acting at the age of 12. After making his debut in Defending Your Life (1991), he starred in several films, including Dutch (1991), All I Want for Christmas (1991), A Far Off Place (1993), Empire Records (1995), That Thing You Do! (1996),  Vegas Vacation (1997), and the teen comedy Can't Hardly Wait (1998).

In 2002, Embry appeared as Bobby Ray Bailey opposite Reese Witherspoon in Sweet Home Alabama. The two actors had previously worked together a decade prior in the 1993 live action Disney film A Far Off Place. 

Embry had a major role in Showtime's Brotherhood, which premiered in 2006 and in 2013 he had a recurring role as Greg Mendell on the television series Once Upon a Time. In 2015, Embry had a guest role as Carter on The Walking Dead. That same year, Embry began a recurring role as Coyote Bergstein on Grace and Frankie on Netflix.

In 2018, Embry took a small role as a supporting astronaut in the Damien Chazelle film First Man.

Embry has appeared in a recurring role as the real Pete Murphy in Sneaky Pete, an Amazon Video original series.

Personal life
Embry married actress Amelinda Smith on November 14, 1998; they divorced in 2002. They have one child together, Cogeian Sky Embry.

Embry married actress Sunny Mabrey on July 17, 2005. In 2012, Mabrey filed for divorce, citing irreconcilable differences. In 2013, Embry and Mabrey began dating again, and remarried in June 2015. Embry and Mabrey have homes in Los Angeles and Atlanta.

In November 2006, Embry and Mabrey were robbed at gunpoint in their driveway.

In 2008, Embry settled a lawsuit with former Deal or No Deal model Angelina Roudeza, who had sued him after being scarred over her torso when thrown from his motorcycle in 2005.

Filmography

Film

Television

References

External links
 
 
 

Living people
American male child actors
American male film actors
American male television actors
20th-century American male actors
21st-century American male actors
1978 births